Frank Langstone (10 December 1881 – 15 June 1969) was a New Zealand Member of Parliament, Cabinet Minister and High Commissioner to Canada.

Biography

Early life
Langstone was born in Bulls probably on 10 December 1881. He was the fourth of five children to Charles Walter Langston, a vet, Margaret McDermott, a seamstress. His father abandoned the family and not long after his mother died on 23 December 1890. His older sister Katherine took care of the family, thus financial pressures prevented him having a proper education, though he was an extensive reader. Eventually he went into foster care where he continued self educating himself before he became an apprentice blacksmith.

In around 1906 Langstone moved to Masterton where he became the proprietor of the refreshment rooms at the railway depot, and later ran a billiard saloon. On 24 April 1906 he married Agnes Clementine King, they had five sons and two daughters. He was involved with setting up the left-wing Maoriland Worker newspaper in 1910.

He later became a shearer and was involved in the Wellington branch of the New Zealand Shearers' Union before moving to Te Kuiti, in the King Country in 1913 to run a local restaurant. He briefly lived in Auckland before returning to Te Kuiti in 1918 to become the proprietor of a railway restaurant in Taumarunui, and a fish-and-chip shop in 1919. After joining the Shearers' Union Langstone became politically active, joining the first Labour Party in 1910 and then the Social Democratic Party (SDP) from 1913, of which he was president of the Te Kuti branch. He was a foundation member of the Labour Party in 1916 after it absorbed the SDP.

Political career

Member of Parliament

Throughout his parliamentary career Langstone consistently advocated for the creation of a state-owned bank, development of lands for agriculture, a financial safety net for farmers. He held the electorate until 1925 when he was defeated, returning to the Taumarunui restaurant, which Agnes managed during his time in Parliament. In 1926 he was unsuccessful in seeking the Labour nomination for the Eden by-election. He then switched to the Auckland electorate of Roskill from 1946 to 1949.

Langstone was President of the New Zealand Labour Party from 1933 to 1934. During this time he became influenced by the Social Credit ideas of C. H. Douglas, which were to form the basis of all his subsequent party policy ideas. In 1935, he was awarded the King George V Silver Jubilee Medal.

He was described as "a cheerful, shortish extrovert with a better brain than most people thought he had". As he was deaf, he was allowed to listen to debates in the chamber on a small radio with headphones. When a dull back-bencher was on, he was known to tune into livelier commercial stations, when he would beat time to the music with his hands. Langstone was an impressive orator, as adept at Robert Semple and John A. Lee at engaging with the public. Despite this, his pursuit of ideas and views (particularly on financial matters) which were not shared by his more senior colleagues prevented him being appointed to more influential roles.

Cabinet Minister
He was appointed Minister of Lands and Commissioner of State Forests from 1935 to 1942 by Michael Joseph Savage during the First Labour Government. He impressed senior civil servants with his administrative abilities and had particular concerns regarding soil erosion, river control and afforestation.

When Peter Fraser succeeded Savage, he appointed Langstone Minister of External Affairs, Native Minister and Minister for the Cook Islands from 1940 to 1942. In April 1942 Fraser appointed him New Zealand's first High Commissioner to Canada. He returned after only six months later, he resigned from cabinet and publicly alleged that Fraser had double-crossed him after promising him the position of Minister to the United States which was given to Walter Nash instead. In September 1943 The Evening Post newspaper claimed that Langstone had been recalled because of serious misconduct. Langstone sued the paper for libel and was awarded £200 in damages in February 1944.

After the expulsion of John A. Lee, Langstone became recognized as the leading voice of the radical wing of the Labour Party. He also opposed New Zealand joining the International Monetary Fund. In 1947 Langstone proposed that the government make the state-owned Bank of New Zealand the sole legal issuer of bank credit over loans and overdrafts in an attempt to secure state control over the means of exchange. The proposal was contentious, only three other Labour MPs openly supported the idea, and was rejected as too radical however.

Split from Labour
In 1949 Langstone resigned from the Labour Party over the issue of peacetime conscription. Later that year he stood in the Roskill electorate as an Independent but was defeated; coming third with 1097 votes after John Rae (National, 7372 votes) and James Freeman (Labour, 5957 votes). During the 1951 New Zealand waterfront dispute he published a pamphlet opposing the heavy-handed emergency regulations imposed by the First National Government. At the Riccarton by-election in 1956 he made several speeches in support of the Social Credit candidate Wilfrid Owen.

Later life and death
Agnes died on 5 August 1946 and he remarried in Auckland on 11 January 1952 Frank to Catherine Mary "Mollie" Nolan.

Langstone died of a heart attack on 15 June 1969 in Auckland, survived by Mollie, and three sons and two daughters from his first marriage. His ashes were buried at Purewa Cemetery, Auckland.

Further reading

The 1949 General Election by S.E. Fraser (1967, MA Thesis-University of Otago, Dunedin)
The Last Years of the First Labour Government 1945-1949 by R. McLennan (1963, MA Thesis-University of Auckland, Auckland)
The Expulsion of John A. Lee and its Effects on the Development of the Labour Party by B.S. Taylor (1970, MA Thesis-University of Canterbury, Christchurch)

Notes

References

1881 births
1969 deaths
New Zealand Labour Party MPs
Independent MPs of New Zealand
Members of the Cabinet of New Zealand
New Zealand foreign ministers
Social Democratic Party (New Zealand) politicians
Social Credit Party (New Zealand) politicians
High Commissioners of New Zealand to Canada
Members of the New Zealand House of Representatives
New Zealand MPs for Auckland electorates
New Zealand MPs for North Island electorates
Unsuccessful candidates in the 1919 New Zealand general election
Unsuccessful candidates in the 1949 New Zealand general election
Unsuccessful candidates in the 1957 New Zealand general election
Unsuccessful candidates in the 1960 New Zealand general election
Unsuccessful candidates in the 1925 New Zealand general election
People from Bulls, New Zealand
Burials at Purewa Cemetery